Karl Young may refer to:

Karl Young (theatre historian) (1879–1943), professor at Yale University, theatre historian and medievalist
 Karl E. Young (1903–1990), professor at Brigham Young University and historian of Mormonism

See also
Carl Jung (1875–1961), Swiss psychiatrist and founder of analytical psychology
Carl Young, American meteorologist of the TWISTEX tornado research experiment who died in the 2013 El Reno tornado